The Solomon-Smith-Martin House in Macon, Georgia, built in c. 1823 as a farm owner's home, is one of the oldest houses in Macon. It was added to the National Register of Historic Places on July 14, 1971. It is located at 2619 Vineville Avenue.

It is constructed of hand-sawn boards, hand-made bricks, and pegs rather than nails.

See also
National Register of Historic Places listings in Bibb County, Georgia

References

Houses on the National Register of Historic Places in Georgia (U.S. state)
Houses in Macon, Georgia
Early Republic architecture